Nam Định is a province in the southern part of the Red River Delta region of northern Vietnam. It borders Ninh Bình province to the southwest, Hà Nam province to the northwest, Thái Bình province to the northeast, and the Gulf of Tonkin to the southeast. , it is the 52nd largest province by area and the 12th most populous province of Vietnam.

Nam Định has been one of the most important regions of Vietnam throughout its history due to the fact that it is located on the Red River Delta. It is the birthplace of many famous Vietnamese historical figures, most notably Trần Hưng Đạo. It is also said to be the place where the Vietnamese dish Phở came from.

History

Administrative divisions
Nam Định is subdivided into 10 district-level sub-divisions:

 9 districts:

 Giao Thủy
 Hải Hậu
 Mỹ Lộc
 Nam Trực
 Nghĩa Hưng
 Trực Ninh
 Vụ Bản
 Xuân Trường
 Ý Yên

 1 provincial city:
 Nam Định (capital)

They are further subdivided into 15 commune-level towns (or townlets), 194 communes, and 20 wards.

Topography
Nam Định province can be divided into 3 regions:

The low-lying delta region, comprising Vụ Bản district, Ý Yên district, Nam Trực district, Trực Ninh district, and Xuân Trường district. This region has a high level of agriculture and textile and manufacturing industries.

The lowland coastal region, which is home to Giao Thủy, Hải Hậu, and Nghĩa Hưng districts. Xuân Thủy National Nature Reserve is located in this region.

The Central region, where Nam Định is located, is supported through textile and garment industries, mechanical and processing industries, and traditional trades. Along with a general services sector, there is a growing professional sector as well. Nam Định is at the center of Vietnam's growing textile and trade gateway to the south via the Red River Delta.

Nam Định has four major estuaries: Ba Lạt, Đáy, Lạch Giang and Hà Lạn.

Climate
Like most other provinces in the North Delta region, Nam Định has a humid subtropical climate. The average annual temperature ranges from 23 to 24 °C (73 to 75 °F). The coldest months are December and January, with average temperatures ranging from 16 to 17 °C (61 to 63 °F) and the hottest month being July, with temperatures over 29 °C (84 °F). The total number of hours of sunlight per year averages out about 1,650 to 1,700 hours per year, and the average relative humidity is 80 to 85 per cent. Additionally, being next to the Gulf of Tonkin, Nam Định is normally affected by tropical storms and monsoons, with an average of four to six storms per year.

Economy
In 2000, the estimated provincial gross domestic product reached US$400,000 (5.92 billion đồngs). In 2005, the economy structure was as follows: agriculture, forestry and fishing 41 per cent; industrial and construction 21.5 per cent; services 38 per cent.

Industrial zones
The total estimated investment is about US$18.76 billion, with approximately 86 investment projects.
 Mỹ Trung Industrial Park: Located in Mỹ Lộc District and Lộc Hạ Ward, in the city of Nam Định, bordering National Highway 10. The total expected investment is approximately US$16.2 – 19 million (300-350 billion VND).
 Thành An Industrial Park: Located in the colonial part of Nam Định and Tân Thành - Vụ Bản, which borders National Highway 10 and connecting roads from National Highway 10 to Road 21, which leads to the port of Hải Thịnh and other southern districts of the province. The total investment for Thành An is approximately US$19 – 21.6 million (350-400 billion VND).
This industrial park was first setup as an investment infrastructure for Vietnam Petroleum Corporation.
 Ninh Cơ Industrial Park: Located along the Ninh Cơ River, it is approximately 500 ha, which includes seaports, ship building, industrial engineering, import and export processing and transporting, and tourism services along the river in two districts (Hải Hậu and Nghĩa Hưng). Ninh Cơ Industrial Park is operated by VINASHIN Shipbuilding Company.

Culture and society

Education
Nam Định province is well known in Vietnam for its traditional education system and schools. Nam Định has several Universities and Colleges. Lê Hồng Phong High School is one of the top ranked high schools in all of Vietnam. Other top schools in Nam Định are Giao Thủy A High School, Trần Hưng Đạo High School, Nguyễn Khuyến High School, and Hải Hậu A, which were all in Vietnam's top 200 schools (National High School Standards - 2003). Nam Định has 16 schools in the top 200, in addition to five schools in Vietnam's top 100 schools of 2009.

List of Universities and Colleges
University of Hoa Lu (Trường Đại học Hoa Lư)
Nam Dinh University of Nursing (Trường Đại học Điều dưỡng Nam Định)
University Technical Economics Nam Dinh (Trường Đại học Kinh tế Kỹ thuật Nam Định)
Nam Dinh University of Technology Education (Trường Đại học Sư phạm Kỹ thuật Nam Định)
Luong the Vinh University (Trường Đại học Lương Thế Vinh)
Nam Dinh College of Education

Religions
The main religions in Nam Định province are đạo Mẫu (a folk religion originated in the province in the 16th century), Buddhism (especially Zen school during the Trần dynasty), and Catholicism (part of Hanoi Archdiocese and the whole of Bùi-chu Diocese).

References

External links

 
Provinces of Vietnam